This is a list of statues of Queen Victoria of the United Kingdom, in locations worldwide.

Africa

Asia

Australia

Canada

Caribbean

Europe (other)

India

New Zealand

South Africa

United Kingdom

Scotland

North East England

North West England

Yorkshire and the Humber

East & West Midlands

East Anglia and South East England

London

South West England

Wales

Northern Ireland

Also a statue at Royal Victoria Hospital Belfast

See also
 Royal monuments in Canada

References

Further reading

External links

Victoria